Bonfante is a surname. Notable people with the surname include:

 Giuliano Bonfante (1904–2005), Italian linguist
 Larissa Bonfante (1931–2019), Italian-American classicist
 Paola Bonfante (born 1947), Italian botanist

Italian-language surnames